The Charleston and Western Carolina Railway (C&WC) was formed in 1896 to operate the lines of the former Port Royal and Augusta Railway (PR&A) and the Port Royal and Western Carolina Railway (PR&WC).  The PR&A and PR&WC had originally been part of the Central of Georgia Railroad but the South Carolina Legislature had forced the railroad to give up the subsidiary lines.  The Atlantic Coast Line Railroad (ACL) took over the C&WC in 1897 but operated it as a subsidiary until 1959 when the ACL fully absorbed it. Much of the original system is still in use by ACL successor CSX Transportation.

Origins

When the Charleston & Western Carolina Railway was created in 1896, it combined two existing railroads, the Port Royal and Augusta Railway and the Port Royal and Western Carolina Railway into a single entity. The oldest portion of the line, the PR&A, ran from Port Royal to Augusta, a distance of  following its completion in 1873. It was financed by the Georgia Railroad of Augusta, which sought to extend its own network and gain access to a port on the east coast. Fearing its port at Savannah would be compromised by any expansion of the facilities at Port Royal, the Central of Georgia Railway took control of the Port Royal & Augusta in 1881.

The Central of Georgia sought to expand into the western portion of South Carolina in order to funnel traffic through their lines out of Augusta. In order to accomplish this goal, the Central leased the Augusta and Knoxville Railroad in 1883, which owned a  line from Augusta to Greenwood. Shortly thereafter, the Central financed construction of three new lines; the first was an extension from Greenwood to Spartanburg,  completed in 1885, the second a branch from McCormick to Anderson, and a final branch from Laurens to Greenville, . In 1886, all of these branches including the Augusta & Knoxville were merged to create the Port Royal and Western Carolina Railway. Financial trouble in 1894 caused the Central of Georgia to lose control of both companies.

Finally, in 1896, the Charleston & Western Carolina Railway was organized to consolidate both railroads into a single entity. The result was a  railroad network covering most of western South Carolina. In 1897, the Atlantic Coast Line took control of the C&WC and operated the railroad as an independent company.  

The C&WC operated passenger train service between Augusta and Port Royal, with a major transfer stop at Yemassee, South Carolina. At the Yemassee passengers could transfer to ACL trains to Savannah and to Charleston. Passenger service ended between 1954 and 1957.

The ACL formally absorbed the C&WC in 1959. From there, the trackage of the former C&WC moved through the merger tree, first to the Seaboard Coast Line in 1967, followed by the Seaboard System in 1983, and finally CSX Transportation in 1986. Most of the original C&WC system survives under CSX Transportation, while the remains of the former Laurens to Greenville branch survives as the Carolina Piedmont Railroad.

References

Defunct South Carolina railroads
Passenger rail transportation in Georgia (U.S. state)
Passenger rail transportation in South Carolina
Railway companies established in 1896
Railway companies disestablished in 1959
Former Class I railroads in the United States
Predecessors of the Atlantic Coast Line Railroad
Defunct Georgia (U.S. state) railroads
American companies disestablished in 1959
American companies established in 1896